Afrasura peripherica is a moth of the subfamily Arctiinae first described by Embrik Strand in 1912. It is found in Cameroon, the Democratic Republic of the Congo, Kenya, Rwanda and Uganda.

Subspecies
Afrasura peripherica peripherica
Afrasura peripherica hilara (Kiriakoff, 1958) (Democratic Republic of the Congo, Rwanda)

References

Moths described in 1912
peripherica
Moths of Africa
Insects of Cameroon
Insects of Uganda
Insects of Rwanda